Breaking Loose is a 1988 Australian film. It was a sequel to Summer City (1977).

Production
Avalon had dropped out of the film industry after an unhappy experience on Little Boy Lost. Having bought a surf shop he continued surfing competitively and continuing his acting career in movies. One day Alan Dickes who had directed Avalon's first film, Double Dealer suggested he do a sequel to Summer City. Avalon paid Dickes a fee to write a script, which Avalon was unhappy with - but still keen on a sequel. After writing an outline and draft he contacted and hired Rod Hay to direct. Together they continued on the screenplay when Avalon contacted Denis Whitburn to do a final draft script.

The movie was originally announced in 1985 as The End of Innocence when it was to be written and directed by Alan Dickes and to star Christopher Pate.

Avalon later wrote he felt Rod Hay and Denis Whitburn "were definitely not on the same page" when it came to the storyline, Rod wanted more action, whereas Denis was more into the character and history of the original. A large percentage of the $1.3 million budget was invested by Hotel Owner and developer Eric Jury. Avalon raised the balance through his Newcastle friends.

Filming
Some filming was done at Eric Porters Studio in North Sydney which had been bought by Jury to convert into a squash court. After the film was completed and released Jury approached Avalon re a partnership offer to update and convert the studios into a fully fledged movie studio. The deal done, Avalon modernized and rebuilt the film studio which became the Avalon Film Studio with films and TV series booking it constantly.

Location filming was done at Catherine Bay. According to Avalon, there were some difficulties on the set involving Hay and the actors so he approached cast member Vince Martin to help smooth the relationship. Avalon later repaid Martin by offering him a chance to direct a feature, the Sher Mountain Killings Mystery.

Reception
Avalon says he sold the film for over a million dollars to various territories before it had been even finished. He also had success with a "Breaking Loose" clothing range.

References

External links
 Breaking Loose at IMDb
 Breaking Loose at Oz Movies

Australian action drama films
1980s English-language films
1988 films
1980s Australian films